List of events from the year 2020 in Kenya.

Incumbents
President: Uhuru Kenyatta

Events
 5 January – War in Somalia: Camp Simba attack.
13 March – First case of the COVID-19 pandemic in the country.
March 15 – Cabinet Secretary for Health, Mutahi Kagwe, announced that two people who had sat next to the initial patient on an aircraft in transit from the United States had also tested positive for the virus.
18 June – Kenya narrowly achieves a majority in the second day of voting, defeating Djibouti in the 2020 United Nations Security Council Elections. Kenya wins a two-year seat on the United Nations Security Council to begin January 1, 2021.
25 June – Police officers killed three people at a protest in Lesos, Nandi East Sub-County.
30 October – The United Nations and the World Food Programme launch a major cash and nutrition relief project in conjunction with local and national authorities to provide aid for 400,000 urban poor in COVID-19 hotspots.
16 November – COVID-19 pandemic: Schools close and student pregnancies increase during lockdown.
10 December – A high court orders the government to compensate four victims of sexual attacks by security agents during post-election violence during violence following the 2007 Kenyan general election.
15 December – Somalia cuts diplomatic ties with Kenya after Muse Bihi Abdi from Somalialand visits Kenya.
16 December – Cholo Abdi Abdullah, 30, a Kenyan national, is transferred to United States custody after being arrested in the Philippines on terrorism charges in an alleged 9/11-type attack on behalf of Al-Shabaab.
21 December – COVID-19 pandemic: Thousands of members of the Kenya Medical Practitioners Pharmacists and Dentists Union go on strike, demanding more PPE and better health insurance. Kenya reports 94,500 COVID-19 cases and 1,639 deaths.
30 December – Al-Shabaab gunmen kill a man taking his pregnant wife to hospital.

Deaths
6 September – Dickson Wamwiri, Olympic taekwondo practitioner (b. 1984).
12 September – Linus Okok Okwach, Roman Catholic prelate and former Bishop of Homa Bay (b. 1952).
4 October – Rosemary Aluoch, 44, footballer (Kampala Capital City Authority FC, OC Bukavu Dawa, national team).
24 October – Nzamba Kitonga, 64, lawyer and politician.
3 December – Kiptarus arap Kirior, Kenyan politician, MP (1983–1988, 1992–1997).
11 December
Boniface Kabaka, politician, Senator (since 2017), stroke.
Joseph Nyagah, 72, politician, COVID-19.
18 December – John Obiero Nyagarama, 74, politician, Governor of Nyamira County (since 2013); COVID-19.
26 December – Johnson Gicheru, 79, judge, Chief Justice (2003–2011).
December 27 – Gunga Mwinga, 45, politician, MP (2013–2017).

See also

2020 in East Africa
COVID-19 pandemic in Kenya
COVID-19 pandemic in Africa
List of George Floyd protests outside the United States

References

 
2020s in Kenya
Years of the 21st century in Kenya
Kenya